Taiwan relies on imports for almost 98% of its energy in 2016, which leaves the island's energy supply vulnerable to external disruption. In order to reduce this dependence, the Ministry of Economic Affairs' Bureau of Energy has been actively promoting energy research at several universities since the 1990s.

, in Taiwan, oil accounts for 48.28% of the total energy consumption. Coal comes next with 29.38%, followed by natural gas (indigenous and liquefied) with 15.18%, nuclear energy with 5.38%, biomass and waste with 1.13%, and energy from other renewable sources (plus hydroelectric power) with 0.64%. Taiwan has 3 active nuclear reactors.

In 2020, 45% of Taiwan's electricity generation came from coal, 35.7% from natural gas, 11.2% from nuclear, and 5.4% from renewables.

The 2016 election was won by the Pan-Green Coalition with policies that included a move toward a nuclear-free society, and is considering legislating to phase out nuclear power generation within nine years.

The 2018 referendum showed a decisive victory of pro-nuclear movement, where 59% of voters rejected the idea of nuclear-free society and phase-out of nuclear power.

Nuclear energy

Nuclear energy is controversial, and the privatization of the energy market (with Taipower that is owned by the state), originally planned in 2001, has been postponed to 2006. Nuclear energy provides one quarter of base load power generation and 16% from overall generation in Taiwan. In 2012, nuclear power accounted for a total 38,890 GWh of electricity generation in Taiwan.

Liquefied natural gas
The annual output of liquefied natural gas (LNG) from exploration and production within Taiwan is 350-400 million m3. While on the other hand, Taiwan imported 18.4 billion m3 of LNG, the fifth largest LNG importer in the world, primarily from Qatar, Malaysia and Indonesia. LNG-fired power plants in Taiwan produce electricity at a cost of NT$3.91/kWh, more than the electricity cost charged to the customers.

The Democratic Progressive Party Government of the Republic of China under Chen Shui-bian was elected in early 2000 promising to approve only liquefied natural gas power projects in the future, and to increase the share of liquefied natural gas of Taiwan's power generation to roughly one-third by 2010. President Chen's administration tried to stop the 2,600 MW Longmen Nuclear Power Plant, currently under construction, but a court has ruled the construction could not be aborted.

In January 2013, China National Offshore Oil Corporation (CNOOC) and Shinfox signed an agreement to supply Kinmen with liquefied natural gas (LNG) from Mainland China. The delivery of LNG is expected to be started in early 2015 to industrial companies. At a later stage, the supply will be increased up to 100,000 tonnes per year to include power plants and households. The agreement was witnessed by Minister of Environmental Protection Administration Stephen Shen. Shen said that the cooperation is helpful to help Taiwan in realizing Kinmen to be a tourism-focused low-carbon county. During the third Cross-Strait Entrepreneurs Summit in Nanjing on 2–3 November 2015, executives from CNOOC and Shinfox gave a briefing on the joint venture project. Under the cooperation framework, CNOOC facilities in Fujian will also supply compressed natural gas, along with production technology.

As of 2017, the safety stock of LNG imported to Taiwan is seven days. In 2017 Taiwan was the world's fifth largest importer of LNG accounting for 6% of global market share.

Renewable energy

In June 2009, the Legislative Yuan passed a renewable energy act aimed at promoting the use of renewable energy, boosting energy diversification and helping reduce greenhouse gases. The new law authorizes the government to enhance incentives for the development of renewable energy via a variety of methods, including the acquisition mechanism, incentives for demonstration projects, and the loosening of regulatory restrictions in order to increase Taiwan's renewable energy generation capacity by 6.5 gigawatts to 10 gigawatts within 20 years.

In July 2009,  the Executive Yuan approved a proposal consisting of 16 measures to transform Taiwan into a “low carbon” country by 2020. The  Ministry of Economic Affairs’ (MOEA) proposal set a long-term goal of cutting total annual greenhouse gas emissions to 2000 levels by the year 2025. The Executive Yuan also requested the legislature to complete a bill on reducing carbon emissions and another bill on developing renewable energy. NT$226 million will be used to promote renewable energy and facilities in homes and public buildings. Over the next five years NT$20 billion would be invested into advanced technologies in seven industries: solar energy, LED lighting, wind power, hydrogen energy and fuel cells, biofuel, energy information and communications technology and electric vehicles. Cooperation between local governments and the central government will be enhanced by providing incentives for conserving energy and cutting emissions. Two pilot communities will be created per county or city over 2009-2011, with 50 percent of the energy supply in those areas coming from renewable sources.

In August 2009, Taiwan's government has announced that it will invest T$45 billion ($1.4 billion) in the island's domestic renewable energy sector in an attempt to help the sector grow nearly eight-fold by 2015 thereby increasing industry production value to T$1.158 trillion in 2015 compared to T$160.3 billion in mid-2009. Proponents hope that "the green energy sector will help Taiwan become a major power in energy technology and production, as well as provide the creation of green jobs."

In May 2016 Economics Minister Lee Shih-guang stated that the government expects renewable energy to account for 20% of electricity generation by 2025, to support the government's ambition to phase out nuclear power generation.

Emissions

Total carbon dioxide emissions nationwide were 277.645 million tonnes in 2006, representing 124.68 percent growth over 1990's 123.574 million tonnes, according to the Environmental Protection Administration (EPA). Energy conversion industry contributed to 6.9 percent of emissions in 2006, while heavy industry contributed 52.5 percent, the transportation sector contributed 14.3 percent, the commercial sector 6.3 percent and private households 12.1 percent.

Taiwan ranked third in Asia and 32nd worldwide in the 2009 Climate Change Performance Index (CCPI) for carbon dioxide emissions, published by Climate Action Network Europe (CAN-Europe) and Germanwatch.

Energy consumption

Taiwan produces electricity from fossil fuels, wind, nuclear and hydro power. Taiwan's energy consumption the equivalent of 10.5 million kiloliters of oil, or about 2.2 million barrels a day.

Consumption of petroleum products account for about half of Taiwan's energy supply equivalent of 4.5 million kiloliters of oil. Demand for diesel declined 21 percent, while that for gasoline dropped 8.7 percent. Monthly Power consumption is around  20.9 billion kilowatt-hours. Formosa Petrochemical Corp. and CPC Corp are Taiwan's only oil refiners.

Energy use in the first six months of the year rose 6.7 percent to the equivalent of 61.6 million kiloliters of oil, the energy bureau said.

Crude oil processing: 4.59 million kiloliters in June.

Coal imports: 5.23 million metric tons 

Imports of crude oil: 26.9 million kiloliters

[LNG] purchases: 5.58 billion cubic meters. Purchases of liquefied natural gas increased 13 percent to 1.06 billion cubic meters. LNG accounted for 97 percent of gas supply.

In 2013, coal imports to Taiwan amounted 65.96 million tons, which consists of 58.96 million tons of steam coal and 7.02 million tons of coking coal. The largest coal exporter country to Taiwan is Indonesia (41.64%) and Australia (40.20%).

Energy efficiency 

The Taiwan government has been active in promoting energy efficiency, and set a target of energy efficiency of 33% by 2025. This target is higher than Japan's commitment to APEC with the target of 25%-26% efficiency. The government is currently assisting 200 major energy users (companies and organizations) in implementing energy-saving measures.

Taiwan is preparing for the age of high oil prices, and is proactively developing clean energy, such as solar and wind power and biofuels. The efforts would help reduce Taiwan's reliance on imported oil, while contributing to the reduction of greenhouse gases.

The government aims for renewable energy to account for 15% of the nation's energy by 2025. It would amount to 8.45 million kilowatts, capable of producing 28.7 billion kilowatt hours of electricity. Wind-generated power could create as much as 8.9 billion kilowatt hours of electricity by 2025, comparable to 2.3 times the capacity of Linkou's thermal power plants. Many domestic companies are now beginning to work on the development of solar energy, and conservative estimates are projecting that 1.2 billion kilowatt hours of electricity will be produced through solar power by 2025.

Under the Energy Management Law and the underlying Implementing Regulations and related measures, companies are encouraged to improve the energy efficiency of their operations and products. Mandatory programs have been established for the purpose of energy conservation, including energy audit and energy efficiency standards for certain electrical and electronic products.

The Energy Commission under the Ministry of Economic Affairs is responsible for formulating and implementing energy policy and laws, including the programs instituted under the Energy Management Law. The principal responsibilities of the Energy Commission include:

 supervising general affairs related to energy management to assure the stability of energy supply;
 accelerating the rationalization of energy pricing;
 promoting the effectiveness of energy utilization;
 preventing energy-related environmental pollution; and
 enhancing energy research and development.

The day-to-day work of the Energy Commission involves activities such as the development of policies and regulations, planning and conservation, research and development of technology, and data collection, processing, and publication.

Through the Greenmark program set up by the Fundamentals for Promoting the Use of the Taiwan Ecolabel, a number of energy-using appliances have been granted Ecolabels. For the electronic products, energy efficiency is one of the most important criteria for granting Green Marks. For further details, refer to the section on packaging and labeling. The Statute for Upgrading Industries also provides incentives for the improvement of energy efficiency.

Hydrogen fuel cell 

Hydrogen-powered fuel cell research started fairly late in Taiwan when the Industrial Technology Research Institute (ITRI) began its research on fuel cell technology in 2001. The ITRI's current focus is on proton exchange membrane fuel cells, especially 3-kilowatt class fuel cell power systems, which are suitable for most Taiwanese households' average energy consumption. Presently, the high cost of manufacturing this type of fuel cell is still the most serious obstacle. It is estimated that Taiwan will catch up with other nations and mass-produce fuel cells between 2015 and 2020.

Bioenergy 

Biodiesel, a diesel-equivalent made from vegetable oils or animal fats, is considered a  practical option for the island. Biodiesel's greatest advantages are that it can be distributed through existing diesel infrastructure and be used in conjunction with petro-diesel after an inexpensive engine conversion.

Energy research 

The Center for Energy Research (CER) at National Central University has initiated a plan to educate energy professionals. It would coordinate professors from related disciplines and build a diversified teaching platform to recruit young students and researchers. Educating young scientists in the field of green technology and encouraging them to create innovative products will provide Taiwan with an edge in the international market.

Energy Technology and Management Research Center at National Chiao Tung University
CER at National Central University 
New Energy Research Center at National Taiwan University

Currently there are four nuclear research centers in Taiwan ranging up to 2.8 MW.

Dr. Yuan Tseh Lee is alumni of National Tsing Hua University and actual Taiwanese Nobel Prize scientist at Lawrence Berkeley National Laboratory using with scientific method and with understanding on laws of thermodynamics looking for energy sources with high net capacity factor as base load power source and low carbon footprint.

Taiwan has to step up its pace in fusion power research if it wishes to develop more sources of "clean" energy according to Dr. Cheng Chio-Zong

See also

 List of power stations in Taiwan
 Taiwan Power Company
 Economy of Taiwan
 Electricity sector in Taiwan
 Nuclear power in Taiwan
 Renewable energy in Taiwan
 Ministry of Science and Technology (Taiwan)

References

Further reading 

 Renewable energy in Taiwan: Its developing status and strategy. Energy, Volume 32, Issue 9, September 2007, Pages 1634-1646
 Current status and development policies on renewable energy technology research in Taiwan Renewable and Sustainable Energy Reviews. Volume 9, Issue 3, June 2005, Pages 237-253
 Renewable energy perspectives and support mechanisms in Taiwan
 Development of Hydrogen Energy/Fuel Cell in Taiwan
  Industrialization and Energy Policy in Taiwan Postwar (I)  [in Japanese] 
 Promotion strategies for renewable energy in Taiwan Renewable and Sustainable Energy Reviews. Volume 12, Issue 6, August 2008, Pages 1681-1691

External links 
 Energy Information Network—energy audits, statistics, consumer and other energy-related information-gathering
 Climate Change Taiwan—Mitigating Global Warming: what Taiwan is Doing
 Energy Statistics Taiwan - Energy and Resources - Country Profile Taiwan Energy Facts & Stats
 Taiwan energy profile statistics (EIA)
 Taiwan - Energy Information Administration (2005)
 Taiwan - Energy Information Administration (2008)
 Bureau of Energy, Ministry of Economic Affairs
 核能研究所(INER)-Institute of Nuclear Energy Research
 Taiwan Nuclear Power - World Nuclear Association
 Taiwan Association of Energy Service Companies
 Taiwan Environment Information Center
 The Center for Energy and Environmental Research
 The hard truths about renewable energy and subsidies
 Environmental Impacts of Wind Power
 “Renewable Energy: Not Cheap, Not ‘Green’” Turns 15
 Is Solar Really Renewable–and Free?
 Integrating Taiwan’s Strengths into Global Climate Action
 The Paris accord and Taiwan’s exclusion
 Taiwan's top scientist critical of 4th nuclear plant.
 Hsieh says DPP's policy on nuclear power unchanged
 Nuclear plants 'lesser evil': scholar
 Lee Teng-hui says nuclear power plants still needed
 NCKU Nears Step in Nuclear Fusion Power
 Taiwan’s Severe Energy Security Challenges